John Henry Adamson (6 January 1873 – 2 October 1937) was an Australian rules footballer who played three games for South Melbourne in the Victorian Football League between 1897 and 1898. He was the brother of South Melbourne captain Dave Adamson.

Educated at Albert Park State School, Adamson played for Napier Imperial, the South Melbourne junior side in the Metropolitan Junior Football Association, before graduating to play with South Melbourne in the Victorian Football Association from 1893 to 1896. A forward, he was described as being an excellent place kick. 

Adamson won South Melbourne's VFA goal kicking in 1896. 

He made his VFL debut with South Melbourne in round one of 1897, alongside his brother, Dave. 

Adamson was also a noted cricketer; he was a wicketkeeper who played 6 first eleven games for South Melbourne.

Adamson lived in South Melbourne for most of his life and was a member of the local Masonic Lodge. He died in 1937 and was survived by his wife. Adamson is buried at Melbourne General Cemetery.

References

External links

 

1873 births
1937 deaths
Australian rules footballers from Melbourne
Sydney Swans players
South Melbourne cricketers
People from North Melbourne